Mithras is the god central to the Greco-Roman mystery religion of Mithraism.

Mithras may also refer to:
Mithras (butterfly), a genus of butterfly in the family Lycaenidae
Mithras (name)

See also
Mithra, a Zoroastrian deity, the origin of the Greco-Roman Mithras
Mitra (disambiguation)
Mythra (Xenoblade Chronicles 2)